Ban Pho is a district (amphoe) in the western part of Chachoengsao province, central Thailand.

History
The district was established by separating part of Mueang Chachoengsao District in 1903, then named Sanam Chan (สนามจันทร์) by Prince Marubhongse Siribhadhana, the governor of Monthon Prachinburi. In the past Sanam Chan Subdistrict was on both banks of the Bang Pakong River. Around 1906 the government split the area on the left bank where the district office was located to create Ban Pho Subdistrict.

Later, when King Vajiravudh (Rama VI) built the Sanam Chan Palace in Nakhon Pathom in 1911, as the district name was pronounced the same as the Sanam Chan Palace, the government changed the district name to Khao Din District on 20 July 1914. Later they changed to be Ban Pho district in 1917.

The name Ban Pho refers to 'home of bodhi tree'.

Geography
Neighboring districts are (from the north clockwise): Mueang Chachoengsao, Bang Khla, Plaeng Yao of Chachoengsao Province; Phanat Nikhom, Phan Thong of Chon Buri province; Bang Pakong of Chachoengsao Province; and  Bang Bo of Samut Prakan province.

The important water resource is the Bang Pakong River.

Administration

Central administration 
Ban Pho is divided into 17 subdistricts (tambons), which are further subdivided into 73 administrative villages (mubans).

Local administration 
There are four subdistrict municipalities (thesaban tambons) in the district:
 Lat Khwang consisting of subdistrict Lat Khwang.
 Saen Phu Dat consisting of subdistrict Saen Phu Dat.
 Theppharat consisting of parts of subdistricts Ko Rai and Theppharat.
 Ban Pho consisting of subdistrict Ban Pho.

There are 12 subdistrict administrative organizations (SAO) in the district:
 Ko Rai consisting of parts of subdistrict Ko Rai.
 Khlong Khut consisting of subdistrict Khlong Khut.
 Khlong Ban Pho consisting of subdistrict Khlong Ban Pho, Bang Son.
 Khlong Prawet consisting of subdistrict Khlong Prawet.
 Don Sai consisting of subdistrict Don Sai.
 Theppharat consisting of parts of subdistrict Theppharat.
 Nong Tin Nok consisting of subdistrict Nong Tin Nok.
 Nong Bua consisting of subdistrict Tha Phlap, Nong Bua.
 Bang Krut consisting of subdistrict Bang Krut.
 Laem Pradu consisting of subdistrict Laem Pradu.
 Sanam Chan consisting of subdistrict Sanam Chan.
 Sip Et Sok consisting of subdistrict Sip Et Sok.

References

External links
 Ban Pho district history(Thai)

Ban Pho